The Women's Boat to Gaza (WBG) was an initiative by the Freedom Flotilla Coalition in 2016 to challenge the Israeli naval blockade of the Gaza Strip. The WBG consisted of an entirely female crew and one ship, Zaytouna-Oliva. It started from Barcelona on 14 September 2016 and visited Ajaccio, Corsica and Messina, Sicily along the way. On 5 October 2016, the Israeli Navy intercepted the Women's Boat to Gaza and detained its crew members, who were taken to the Israeli port of Ashdod. The activists were subsequently deported to their home countries.

Goals and objectives
The Freedom Flotilla Coalition launched the Women's Boat to Gaza to raise awareness of the role of women in advancing the Palestinian struggle in the Palestinian Territories and diaspora. The Women's Boat to Gaza also supported the goals of the Boycott, Divestment and Sanctions campaign: 

 Ending its occupation and colonization of all Arab lands and dismantling the Wall;
 Recognizing the fundamental rights of the Arab-Palestinian citizens of Israel to full equality; and
 Respecting, protecting and promoting the rights of Palestinian refugees to return to their homes and properties as stipulated in UN Resolution 194.

Participants
The Women's Boat to Gaza had a total of 26 participants. The voyage was divided into three legs: Barcelona to Ajaccio, Ajaccio to Messina, and Messina to Gaza. Each leg was crewed by thirteen volunteers with several members alternating at different legs of the voyage.

Ships
The Zaytouna-Oliva was the sole ship in the Women's Boat to Gaza expedition. The Oliva was named after a civil protection boat that the Italian journalist Vittorio Arrigoni sailed in prior to his murder by a Palestinian militant group in Gaza in 2011. A second ship called the Amal-Hope was originally due to participate but pulled out subsequently.

Organization partners
Organizations and campaigns participating in the Women's Boat to Gaza have included Sweden Ship to Gaza, Norway Ship to Gaza, Canadian Boat to Gaza, the Italian Freedom Flotilla, the South African Palestine Solidarity Alliance, the Spanish Rumbo a Gaza, International Committee to Break the Siege of Gaza, US Boat to Gaza, the New Zealand-based Kia Ora Gaza, and Free Gaza Australia.

See also
 Gaza Freedom Flotilla
 Freedom Flotilla II
 Freedom Flotilla III

Notes and references

External links

2016 in Israel
2016 in the Gaza Strip
Blockades
Political activism